Mixed Emotions is the third studio album by Beverley Craven, released in 1999. The album was released after a 5-year hiatus, in which Craven gave birth to two daughters and took time off to take care of her three children.

On this album she did not collaborate with the producer of her previous two albums, Paul Samwell-Smith, and instead Craven fully produced the release.

The lead single, "I Miss You", was released as a promo single and a videoclip was made for it. However, the record label refused to release the single commercially. The album received mixed reviews and it charted at #46 in the UK Albums Chart, staying 2 weeks in the Top 75. Craven made a small tour around the UK to support the album.

No further singles were released from the album, and Craven parted ways with her label Epic Records shortly after. She disappeared from the music scene for ten years before returning in 2009 with her fourth album Close To Home.

Two songs on the album were originally written for film scores, "I Miss You" for the 1996 film The Adventures of Pinocchio, and "We Found a Place" for the 1998 film The Theory of Flight. Both were rejected, however, and not used in the films.

Single releases
 "I Miss You" (Promo single only)
 "We Found a Place" (Polish promo single only)
 "Say You're Sorry" (Polish promo single only)

Details

 Issued on CD, cassette and Mini Disc in 1999 through Epic Records.

Track listing
All tracks written by Beverley Craven.
 "I Miss You"
 "Tick Tock"
 "Come Home to Me"
 "Move On"
 "We Found a Place"
 "Say You're Sorry"
 "Talk to Me"
 "She Doesn't Need Saving"
 "Phoenix from the Fire"
 "Afraid of Letting Go"

Personnel

Musicians
Beverley Craven – vocals, piano, producer, keyboards, backing vocals
Pino Palladino – bass guitar
Manu Katché – drums
Dominic Miller – guitar
Phil Thornalley – acoustic guitar
Ian Bairnson – guitar
Frank Mead – saxophone
Danny Cummings – percussion
Gary Sanctuary – keyboards, piano
Nigel Hine – guitar
Sid Gauld – trumpet
John Giblin – bass guitar
Luis Jardim – percussion
Nick Payne – saxophone
Andy Gangadeen – drums

Production
Producer – Beverley Craven
Engineer – Rick Simpson (track 1)
Engineer – Paul Hicks (track 2)
Engineer – John Hudson (tracks 3–10)
Mixed by John Hudson 
Recorded at Mayfair Studios, Abbey Road Studios, RAK Studios 
Design – Greg Jakobek at Warsaw
Photography – Kim Knott

References

1999 albums
Beverley Craven albums
Epic Records albums